Mysłaków  (German: Matzlowitz) is a village in the administrative district of Gmina Marcinowice, within Świdnica County, Lower Silesian Voivodeship, in south-western Poland.

References

Myslakow